Freestyle was a contemporary art exhibition at The Studio Museum in Harlem from April 28-June 24, 2001 curated by Thelma Golden with the support of curatorial assistant Christine Y. Kim. Golden curated the works of 28 emerging black artists for the exhibition, characterizing the work as ‘Post-Black’.  The latter is a term she generated along with artist Glenn Ligon as a genre of art “that had ideological and chronological dimensions and repercussions. It was characterized by artists who were adamant about not being labeled as 'black' artists, though their work was steeped, in fact deeply interested, in redefining complex notions of blackness." Freestyle was her first major project at The Studio Museum in Harlem and the first of an ongoing series of ‘F’ themed exhibitions including Frequency, Flow and Fore. The most recent iteration of the series was 2017's Fictions.

Background
At the time of the exhibition, Thelma Golden had recently resigned from a position at the Whitney as their first black curator, accepting the position of deputy director at The Studio Museum in Harlem (SMH) during a time of renovation for the museum. Ten years prior to her new role at the SMH, she had worked as a curatorial intern for the same museum. Golden credits her time at the Whitney Museum working on the 1993 Whitney Biennial as: “my curatorial education really on every level: my education about working with artists, my education about commissioning work, my education about understanding the museum context, my education about the notion of audience and how it operates”. She also curated the Whitney’s 1994 Black Male exhibition, thinking of the black male as a subject through the works of a multi-cultural roster of artists and the 1998 Bob Thompson exhibition, which she described as being “the first major survey of a mid-century African-American artist in a long time.”
 
Golden selected "Freestyle" artists based on the quality of her studio visits and her resonance with the artists themselves, referring to herself as someone who deals with artists pushing the definition of American art rather than someone who deals with objects. Her vision for The Studio Museum in Harlem was a place where-in exhibitions would allow space for critique and questions to be explored. Golden was particularly interested in exploring how black artists could shape a contemporary blackness after the activism of the 1960s, the essentialist Black Arts Movement of the 1970s, the theoretical multiculturalism of the 1980s and global expansion of the late 1990s. The work that followed revealed a prevailing theme of black individuality, reflecting Golden’s understanding of the exhibition title, referring to ‘freestyle’ as “the term which refers to the space where the musician (improvisation) or...the dancer (the break) finds the groove and goes all out in a relentless and unbridled expression of the self.” The exhibition was funded by Philip Morris Companies, INC, the Peter Norton Family Foundation and the exhibition fund: Jacqueline Bradley & Clarence Otis, Fifth Floor Foundation and Joel Shappiro.

Works
The artmakers of "Freestyle" experimented with digital media and sound as well as culture-specific materials like hair pomade and curling papers to explore social, political, sexual and ethnic issues. From painting and drawing to sculpture, installation and new media, the work reveals the artists' exposure to both Eastern and Western thought. Some works included:

 Photographs of flames—fires of inspiration and burning crosses—by the Brooklyn artist Rico Gatson
 Three large-format portraits by the 24-year-old photographer Rashid Johnson. Hand-brushed with mineral pigments of a homeless man the artist met in Chicago.
 An overhead sound piece by Nadine Robinson that blends political speeches by George W. Bush and Dr. Martin Luther King Jr., with laugh tracks.
 A video by Susan Smith-Pinelo that gives a continuous closeup of the artist's cleavage in a low-cut dress moving to the rhythm of Michael Jackson's Working Night and Day, as a gold necklace spelling ghetto bounces across her chest.
 Photographs by the Haitian-born Adler Guerrier of empty airport waiting rooms, ready for arrivals and takeoffs.
 A wall painting of a police helicopter done in hair pommade by Kori Newkirk, contributing a romantic nocturnal landscape, fashioned from strings of colored plastic hair beads, of a city skyline touched by fire and/or sunset light.
 Abstract paintings by Mark S. Bradford. Their surfaces are covered with edge-to-edge rectangular bits of paper forming linear grids. The applied scraps are perm endpapers used in hairdressing.
 John Bankston's fairy-tale scenes of a gay black man's progress.
 Kojo Griffin's street-fighting teddy bears.
 David Huffman's murky sci-fi scenarios of a space-traveling Aunt Jemima.
 Laylah Ali's story-board vignettes, made with rendered gouache, of Everyman stick figures bent on mutual destruction.
 Long Distance Lover by Senam Okudzeto, a Chicago-born artist. Her small, nude, figures are shown copulating and fighting.  They are painted directly on phone bill receipts itemizing nightly calls to far-flung places: Uganda, Israel, the Seychelles.
 Drawings of African sculptures by Arnold J. Kemp

Participating artists

 Laylah Ali 
 John Bankston

 Sanford Biggers in collaboration with Jennifer Zackin 
 Mark Bradford
 
 Louis Cameron 
 Adler Guerrier 
 Kori Newkirk 
 Rico Gatson 
 Kojo Griffin 
 Deborah Grant (artist) 
 Trenton Doyle Hancock 
 Tana Hargest 
 Kira Lynn Harris
 David Huffman (artist) 
 Jeral Ieans 
 Rashid Johnson 
 Vincent Johnson 
 Jennie C. Jones
 Arnold Kemp 
 Dave McKenzie 
 Julie Mehretu 
 Adia Millett 
 Camille Norment 
 Senam Okudzeto
 Clifford Owens 
 Nadine Robinson 
 Susan Smith-Pinelo and Eric Wesley.

Bibliography
Byrd, Cathy. "Is There a ‘Post-Black’ Art? Investigating the Legacy of the ‘Freestyle’ Show." Art Papers 26, no. 6 (November 2002): 34-39.
 
Cotter, Holland. “Art Review: A Full Studio Museum Show Starts With 28 Young Artists and a Shoehorn.” New York Times. 2001. https://www.nytimes.com/2001/05/11
/arts/art-review-a-full-studio-museum-show-starts-with-28-young-artists-and-a-shoehorn.html
 
Enwezor, Okwui. "Elsewhere: A Conversation with Thelma Golden." Nka: Journal of Contemporary African Art no. 13/14 (Summer 2001): 26-33.
 
Kim, Christine Y and Franklin Sirmans, Eds. Freestyle: The Studio Museum In Harlem. The Studio Museum of Harlem. New York. 2001.
 
Nadelman, Cynthia. "‘Freestyle’: Studio Museum in Harlem." Artnews 100, no. 8 (September 2001): 173.
 
“Thelma Golden by Glenn Ligon.” The BOMBLive! Artists and Curators Series. (March 2004): Web. http://bombmagazine.org/article/3588/thelma-golden
 
Touré. Who's Afraid of Post-Blackness?: What It Means to Be Black Now. Atria Books. 2012.
 
Thompson, Donna. “Freestyle.” Art Women. (2001): Web. http://www.artwomen.org/
currentissues1/freestyle/review.htm
 
Valdez, Sarah. "Freestyling." Art In America 89, no. 9 (September 2001): 134-162.
http://bombmagazine.org/article/3588/thelma-golden
 
Valentine, Victoria L. “A ‘Freestyle’ Take on Post-Black Art.” CultureType (October 2013): Web. http://www.culturetype.com/2013/10/31/a-freestyle-take-on-post-black-art/

References

Harlem
African-American art